Chandor is a surname. Notable people with the surname include: 

 Douglas Chandor (1897–1953), British-born portrait painter and garden designer
 Chandor Gardens, in Weatherford, Texas, US
 J. C. Chandor (born 1973), American filmmaker
 John Arthur Chandor (1850–1909), American businessman and bigamist
 Valentine Chandor (1875–1935), American educator